Bogdanovo is a rural locality (a village) and the administrative center of Gorozhanskoye Rural Settlement, Ramonsky District, Voronezh Oblast, Russia. The population was 708 as of 2010. There are 16 streets.

Geography 
Bogdanovo is located on the left bank of the Don River, 11 km northwest of Ramon (the district's administrative centre) by road. Galkino is the nearest rural locality.

References 

Rural localities in Ramonsky District